Sara Singh (born 1985) is a Canadian politician. She was one of the two Deputy Leaders of the Ontario New Democratic Party, alongside John Vanthof, and also Opposition Critic for Attorney General from 2018 until 2022. Singh was elected to the Legislative Assembly of Ontario in the 2018 provincial election at the age of 33. She represented the riding of Brampton Centre as a member of the Ontario New Democratic Party until her defeat in the 2022 Ontario general election.

Singh was born in Brampton where her parents met in the early 1980s. Her mother is from Guyana and her father is from Punjab, India. She is the first Indo-Caribbean female to be elected to the Ontario legislature.

She is the founding director of Broadening Horizons, a not-for-profit organization that educates youth about social justice issues and the arts, was Vice-President of Brampton Caledon Community Living

Singh has a master's degree in international development studies from St. Mary's University and a B.A. in political science from York University's Glendon Campus, and has recently earned a Ph.D. specializing in public policy from Toronto Metropolitan University.

Election results

References

Ontario New Democratic Party MPPs
21st-century Canadian politicians
21st-century Canadian women politicians
Living people
Politicians from Brampton
Canadian Hindus
Women MPPs in Ontario
Canadian people of Guyanese descent
Canadian politicians of Punjabi descent
Canadian politicians of Indian descent
Toronto Metropolitan University alumni
1985 births